IdentityForce, Inc. provides identity theft protection software to consumers, businesses, organizations, and U.S. government agencies.

Headquartered in Framingham, Massachusetts, IdentityForce was founded by siblings Steven Bearak and Judy Leary in 2005.

IdentityForce was originally incorporated in Massachusetts, on October 30, 1978, as Stop-Loss Associates, Inc., a sub chapter S corporation. On August 15, 2018 IdentityForce announced it was acquired as a subsidiary of EZShield. In June 2019, EZShield and IdentityForce re-branded under the parent company, Sontiq Inc.

Early History (1978 – 1996) 

In 1978, Herbert P. Bearak founded and incorporated Stop-Loss Associates, Inc., a loss prevention analysis company, which included the development, implementation, and testing of security policy and procedure best practices as well as security equipment and systems.

In 1992, Bearak Reports was established as a service division of Stop-Loss Associates, Inc. Using credit and widely available non-credit information, the company sold a broad range of asset search, background screening, business intelligence and public record information services to law firms, financial services companies, government agencies, and general corporate and private users.

In 1996, Stop-Loss Associates was acquired in an asset sale by the Marcom Group, with Herbert Bearak and other family members retaining 100% of the company’s stock. Following the sale the company officially changed its name to Bearak Reports, Inc.

In late 1996, The Privacy Group was launched as a service division of Bearak Reports, Inc. The Privacy Group created a toolkit to help consumers protect their personal privacy during the early years of the digital internet revolution.

Establishment of IdentityForce, Inc. 

In 2006, Bearak Reports, Inc. launched IdentityForce, to serve companies and government agencies that experience a data breach. Shortly thereafter, public concern over the security of personal information stored by the federal government was raised when the U. S. Department of Veterans Affairs revealed that it had suffered a data breach that compromised the personal information of more than 28,650,000 active duty personnel and veterans. Subsequently, the U.S. General Services Administration (GSA) awarded Bearak Reports, Inc., d/b/a IdentityForce a government-wide Federal Supply Schedule Blanket Purchase Agreement (BPA) for identity monitoring, and data breach response and protection services.

In 2011 and 2013 the company was awarded other blanket purchase agreements for similar products.  In 2015 IdentityForce, was awarded Tier One status as an approved provider of identity protection services for data breaches affecting over 21.5 million people. In 2016 Bearak Reports, Inc. officially changed its name to IdentityForce, Inc.

Acquisition by EZShield (2018) 
On August 15, 2018, IdentityForce was acquired by EZShield, a portfolio company of the Wicks group, for an undisclosed amount. EZShield said the acquisition will expand its capabilities to offer digital security measures as cybercrime increases.

Rebranding Under Sontiq, Inc. (2019) 
On June 26, 2019, IdentityForce merged with EZShield under a new name, Sontiq. The new combined company is headquartered in Framingham, Massachusetts. Brian J. Longe joined Sontiq in March 2020 as the company's President and CEO.

References 

Companies based in Framingham, Massachusetts
American companies established in 2005